Sphaceloma is a genus of ascomycete fungi. Its species are plant pathogens, and cause anthracnose and scab diseases. The widespread genus is estimated to contain 52 species.

References

External links
 

Fungal plant pathogens and diseases
Myriangiales
Dothideomycetes genera